Seaview is a suburb of Timaru, in the South Canterbury area and Canterbury region of New Zealand's South Island. It is located immediately west of the town centre.

Demographics

Seaview had a population of 2,088 at the 2018 New Zealand census, an increase of 60 people (3.0%) since the 2013 census, and a decrease of 90 people (-4.1%) since the 2006 census. There were 969 households. There were 1,017 males and 1,068 females, giving a sex ratio of 0.95 males per female. The median age was 41.6 years (compared with 37.4 years nationally), with 324 people (15.5%) aged under 15 years, 441 (21.1%) aged 15 to 29, 888 (42.5%) aged 30 to 64, and 438 (21.0%) aged 65 or older.

Ethnicities were 85.6% European/Pākehā, 11.6% Māori, 3.3% Pacific peoples, 6.6% Asian, and 2.0% other ethnicities (totals add to more than 100% since people could identify with multiple ethnicities).

The proportion of people born overseas was 15.5%, compared with 27.1% nationally.

Although some people objected to giving their religion, 48.0% had no religion, 39.4% were Christian, 2.0% were Hindu, 0.1% were Muslim, 0.1% were Buddhist and 2.6% had other religions.

Of those at least 15 years old, 231 (13.1%) people had a bachelor or higher degree, and 426 (24.1%) people had no formal qualifications. The median income was $28,300, compared with $31,800 nationally. 201 people (11.4%) earned over $70,000 compared to 17.2% nationally. The employment status of those at least 15 was that 864 (49.0%) people were employed full-time, 228 (12.9%) were part-time, and 63 (3.6%) were unemployed.

References

Suburbs of Timaru
Populated places in Canterbury, New Zealand